Idaville is a census-designated place and unincorporated community in Tillamook County, Oregon, United States. It was founded around the year 1870 by Warren N. Vaughn and named for his daughter Ida. The post office was established in 1922 and closed five years later, in 1927.

References

Unincorporated communities in Tillamook County, Oregon
Census-designated places in Oregon
1922 establishments in Oregon
Census-designated places in Tillamook County, Oregon
Unincorporated communities in Oregon